Vetala Bhatta  was a Sanskrit author from ancient India. He is known to have attributed the work of the sixteen stanza "Niti-pradeepa" (Niti-pradīpa, literally, the lamp of conduct). He is included among the legendary Navaratnas (group of nine scholars) of Vikramaditya's court.

References

Legendary Indian people
Hindu poets